Paul Southern (born 18 March 1976) is a former professional rugby league footballer who played in the 1990s, 2000s and 2010s for St Helens (Heritage № 1118), Salford, Rochdale Hornets, Oldham RLFC (Heritage № 1147), Swinton and Halifax RLFC.

Southern was an Ireland international and played at the 2000 Rugby League World Cup.

References

External links
Halifax profile
Saints Heritage Society profile
The Teams: Ireland

1976 births
Living people
English rugby league players
Halifax R.L.F.C. players
Ireland national rugby league team players
Oldham R.L.F.C. players
Rochdale Hornets players
Rugby league props
Salford Red Devils players
St Helens R.F.C. players
Swinton Lions players